Virgin and Child with an Angel  also known as Our Lady of the Eucharist (Italian: Madonna dell'Eucarestia) is a painting in tempera on wood panel by Sandro Botticelli, executed in c. 1470. It is now held by the Isabella Stewart Gardner Museum in Boston, Massachusetts, having been acquired from Prince Chigi in 1899. The painting measures  and is one of a series of paintings of the Madonna produced by Botticelli between 1465 and 1470. It shows influences from Filippo Lippi's Virgin and Child with Two Angels of c. 1465 in the Uffizi.  

The Virgin Mary is shown in a three-quarter view, with the Christ Child held on her lap. A smiling angel, wearing a crown of myrtle, offers them a bowl containing twelve ears of wheat and grapes. The child raises a hand in benediction, and Mary holds one of the ears of corn.

The scene may be set in a walled garden or hortus conclusus, symbolic of Mary's virginity, with a landscape of hills and a river visible through an opening in the arcade around the wall.  The wheat and grapes are symbolic of the bread and wine of the Eucharist, which themselves symbolise the body and blood of the incarnate Jesus, and the number of ears possibly refer to the number of the apostles at the Last Supper.  

Prince Chigi first offered the painting to Isabella Stewart Gardner in 1899 for $30,000. She demurred initially, but by the time she decided to buy the price was $70,000. The sale was controversial in Italy, where there was press comment that the sale was illegal, and Prince Chigi was fined. The painting was exhibited at Colnaghi in London before being transported to Boston.

References
 Virgin and Child with an Angel, Isabella Stewart Gardner Museum

1470s paintings
Angels in art
Paintings of the Madonna and Child by Sandro Botticelli
Paintings by Sandro Botticelli
Paintings in the collection of the Isabella Stewart Gardner Museum